Events in the year 1771 in Norway.

Incumbents
Monarch: Christian VII

Events
8 February - Jacob Benzon is deposed as Steward of Norway, and the position was vacant until 1809.

Arts and literature
 December - The first theatre in Norway is founded by Martin Nürenbach in Oslo; it is dissolved in 1772.

Full date unknown
 The song «Norges Skaal» is written by Johan Nordahl Brun.

Births
22 February – Jørgen Aall, ship-owner and politician (died 1833)
3 April – Hans Nielsen Hauge, revivalist lay preacher and writer (died 1824)
30 May – Ole Olsen Amundrød, farmer, schoolteacher and politician (died 1835)
8 August - Andreas Aagaard Kiønig, judge and politician (died 1856)
20 August – Jonas Greger Walnum, politician (died 1838)

Deaths

See also